Punch Quest is an endless runner/beat-em-up game for iOS and Android developed by Canadian studio Madgarden and published by Rocketcat Games (iOS) and Noodlecake Studios (Android).

Gameplay

The game is an endless runner, with the goal of punching through as many monsters as possible, collecting  (the game's currency) along the way. The character is controlled by tapping either side of the screen. Hitting the left side of the screen uppercuts and slams opponents downward, while hitting the right performs a forward-dashing jab. As the game progresses, the player builds a meter of three special attacks, purchasable with the  you earn each level. Each special attack is unique, and can be swapped out for others in the customization menu along with other outfit customization options, which are also purchasable.

Critical reception

The game received "universal acclaim" according to the review aggregation website Metacritic.

TouchArcade wrote, "Punch Quest needs to be on every iOS device you own. It's totally free, the only way the IAP could be less obtrusive is if they removed it entirely, and you'll fall in love with the game inside of the first minute of play. What's not to like about that?" Gamezebo wrote, "Punch Quest is what an endless runner would look like if you threw it into a time machine, spat it out in the early 1990s, and put it on an SNES cartridge. This goes well beyond the (masterful) 16-bit graphics to the ethos of the game itself." AppSpy said, "Punch Quest isn't the 'hardcore' game people have been itching for on the iOS platform, but it's the perfect blend of action-brawling and casual 'endless' gameplay all mixed up with a larger-than-life style that's hard not to enjoy." Slide To Play wrote, "Whether you prefer old-school platformers or the new genre of auto-running games, Punch Quest is a magical, endlessly fun combination of the two." 148Apps said, "Everything about it has come together in a way that is absolutely flawless. This is an absolute must-have. There is no reason not to download it whatsoever."

IGN wrote, "There might not be a better deal on iOS this year. Punch Quest delivers a wallop, all for free. It delivers a 1-2 combination of exceptional endless-running action and the sheer quantity of depth and additional content. It's a knockout." Hyper described it as "Certainly the best kind of F2P game." Modojo wrote, "It's rare to see something this good for free, and with that being said, dismissing this game would be ill advised." Pocket Gamer said, "Punch Quest is funny, addictive, and just plain fun. Turns out that the auto-runner and beat-'em-up genres were a match made in heaven." Digital Spy said, "Punch Quest is a wonderful fast action romp for iOS that will keep drawing players in for a long time to come." Edge wrote, "Punch Quest isn't just good for a free-to-play game. It's good, full stop, infused with humour, depth and the most charming violence imaginable. Unless you're a skeleton knight, in which case the violence is offensive, troubling and needlessly graphic." Destructoid said, "At the end of the day, I wasn't enamored by Punch Quest, but I enjoyed my time with it, and it has enough content to keep you going for a while. If you like endless runners and punching things, odds are you'll enjoy RocketCat's latest effort. If not, I doubt it'll make any convincing arguments to convert you."

References

External links
 

2012 video games
Android (operating system) games
Beat 'em ups
Endless runner games
IOS games
Video games developed in Canada
Noodlecake Games games
Rocketcat Games games